The Phoenix Open (branded as the WM Phoenix Open for sponsorship reasons) is a professional golf tournament on the PGA Tour, held in late January/early February at TPC Scottsdale in Scottsdale, Arizona.

The tournament was originally the Arizona Open, but was known for most of its history as the Phoenix Open until the investment bank Friedman Billings Ramsey became the title sponsor in October 2003, and it was known as the FBR Open for the next six editions. Waste Management, Inc. began its sponsorship in 2010.

The event's relaxed atmosphere, raucous by the standards of professional golf, has earned it the nickname "The Greatest Show on Grass" and made it one of the most popular events on the PGA Tour calendar.

History
The Phoenix Open began  in 1932 but was discontinued after the 1935 tournament. The rebirth of the Phoenix Open came in 1939 when Bob Goldwater Sr. convinced fellow Thunderbirds to help run the event. The Thunderbirds, a prominent civic organization in Phoenix, were not as enthusiastic about running the event as he was, leaving Goldwater Sr. to do most of the work in getting a golf open started.

The event was played at the Phoenix Country Club in Phoenix  both in its earlier incarnations and after Goldwater resuscitated it. Beginning in 1955, the Arizona Country Club (also in Phoenix)  alternated as event host with Phoenix Country Club; this arrangement lasted until Phoenix Country Club took The Arizona Country Club's turn in 1975 and became the event's permanent home again.

The tournament moved  in 1987 to its current home, the Stadium Course at TPC Scottsdale, northeast of downtown Phoenix.

The purse was $8.2 million in 2022, then increased over 140% to $20 million for 2023, with a winner's share of $3.6 million.

Popularity
The five-day attendance of the tournament is usually around a half million, the best-attended event in golf. In 2016, it set a PGA Tour and Phoenix Open single day attendance record with 201,003 fans in attendance on Saturday, February 6 and set a tournament week attendance record of 618,365 fans.

The most popular location for spectators is the par-3 16th hole, nicknamed "The Coliseum." The hole could be described as "one big party," with many students from the nearby Arizona State University in Tempe in attendance. Poor shots at the 16th hole receive boos, because the hole is very easy by the PGA's standards. Good shots, however, are cheered loudly. Players who make holes in one at the 16th will cause the gallery to erupt, leading to beverages and other objects being tossed in celebrations;  Tiger Woods (1997), Jarrod Lyle (2011), and Sam Ryder (2022) have each aced the hole on Saturday, creating raucous celebrations at the hole. The anger of a poor shot can lead to tempers flaring, as Justin Leonard gave obscene gestures to the gallery after a poor shot one year.

Former Arizona State players are very popular at the Phoenix Open, with many often wearing a Pat Tillman jersey when entering the 16th hole stadium.  Phil Mickelson and Jon Rahm are popular there for that reason.  In addition to the golf, there is a concert/party held in the Scottsdale area called the Birds Nest, at which music artists like Huey Lewis and the News play.

The Thunderbirds are still highly active in the organization of the tournament. Portions of the proceeds are used by the Thunderbirds to fund Special Olympics activities in Phoenix.

Conflicts with the Super Bowl
Since 1973, the Phoenix Open has been played on the weekend of the Super Bowl. In 1976, coverage of the tournament's final round was joined in progress immediately after CBS's coverage of Super Bowl X. In 1996, it was played Wednesday through Saturday, as Super Bowl XXX was held at Sun Devil Stadium in nearby Tempe.  In 2009, the tournament overlapped with Super Bowl XLIII in Tampa, Florida, when Kenny Perry and Charley Hoffman went to a playoff. That denied the spectators a chance to watch the beginning of the game on NBC, which featured the local Arizona Cardinals.

Because of the Super Bowl weekend status, the PGA Tour's television contracts with CBS and NBC include an alternating tournament. Usually a CBS tournament, the Phoenix Open airs on NBC when CBS has the Super Bowl, and NBC's Honda Classic aired on CBS during the 2018 Winter Olympics.

Records

The tournament's lowest 72-hole score was set by Mark Calcavecchia in 2001 with 256 (–28), which was matched by Mickelson in 2013. In the second round Calcavecchia scored a 60 (–11), which equalled the lowest score at the Phoenix Open (by Grant Waite in 1996) and subsequently matched by Mickelson in 2005 and 2013. Calcavecchia had 32 birdies in the tournament, which was also an all-time record.

There have been only two double eagles in the history of the Phoenix Open. Tom Pernice Jr. made the first one on the  par-5 15th hole in 1990. Andrew Magee scored the second on the  par-4 17th hole in 2001, and was the first-ever ace on a par-4 in PGA Tour history.

Winners

Note: Green highlight indicates scoring records.
Sources:

Multiple winners
Fifteen men have won this tournament more than once.
 3 wins
 Arnold Palmer: 1961, 1962, 1963 (consecutive)
 Gene Littler: 1955, 1959, 1969
 Mark Calcavecchia: 1989, 1992, 2001
 Phil Mickelson: 1996, 2005, 2013
 2 wins
 Byron Nelson: 1939, 1945
 Ben Hogan: 1946, 1947 (consecutive)
 Jimmy Demaret: 1949, 1950 (consecutive)
 Lloyd Mangrum: 1952, 1953
 Johnny Miller: 1974, 1975 (consecutive)
 Miller Barber: 1971, 1978
 Bob Gilder: 1976, 1983
 Vijay Singh: 1995, 2003
 J. B. Holmes: 2006, 2008
 Hideki Matsuyama: 2016, 2017 (consecutive)
 Brooks Koepka: 2015, 2021
 Scottie Scheffler: 2022, 2023 (consecutive)

Notes

References

External links
 
 Coverage on the PGA Tour's official site

PGA Tour events
Golf in Arizona
Sports in Phoenix, Arizona
Sports in Scottsdale, Arizona
Recurring sporting events established in 1932
1932 establishments in Arizona
Annual sporting events in the United States
Sports competitions in Maricopa County, Arizona